Portnyagin is a Russian masculine surname derived from the occupation of portnyaga, portnoy, meaning tailor. Its feminine counterpart is Portnyagina. The surname may refer to

Dmitry Portnyagin (born 1988), Russian businessman
Igor Portnyagin (born 1989), Russian football player
Paul Portnyagin (1903–1977), Russian Greek-Catholic priest, teacher and orientalist

See also 
Pontryagin

Occupational surnames
Russian-language surnames